Battle of Jhelum, a battle fought by Alexander the Great in 326 BC against King Porus of the Paurava kingdom on the banks of the river Hydaspes (now known as the Jhelum).
 Battle of Jhelum (1857), a battle in 1857 fought between British East India Company Forces and Mutineers.